Damase Racine (May 28, 1855 – December 2, 1921) was an Ontario merchant and political figure. He represented Russell in the Legislative Assembly of Ontario as a Liberal member from 1905 to 1921.

He was born in Crysler, Ontario in 1855, the son of Jean-Baptiste Racine. He married Cora Benoit in 1899. He also served on the county council and as warden for Prescott and Russell Counties. Racine died in office in 1921.

References 
 Histoire des Comtes Unis de Prescott et de Russell, L. Brault (1963)
 Canadian Parliamentary Guide, 1919, AJ Chambers

External links 

1855 births
1921 deaths
Franco-Ontarian people
Ontario Liberal Party MPPs